Prestbury is a village and civil parish in Cheshire, England, about 1.5 miles (3 km) north of Macclesfield. At the 2001 census, it had a population of 3,324; it increased slightly to 3,471 at the 2011 census. Alongside fellow "Cheshire Golden Triangle" villages, Wilmslow and Alderley Edge, it is one of the more sought-after places in the north. The ecclesiastical parish is almost the same as the former Prestbury local government ward which consisted of the civil parishes of Prestbury, Adlington and Mottram St Andrew.

Toponym

As Prestbury was initially settled by priests its name derives from Preôsta burh, which is sometimes thought to mean "priests' town", but more correctly means a priest's fortified enclosure.

History and geography

Prestbury lies between Macclesfield and Wilmslow, for the most part on elevated ground above the flood-prone River Bollin. The ancient Forest of Macclesfield is to the east.

There is no evidence of a settlement before Saxon times, although a cemetery nearby which had been excavated in 1808 contained pottery cremation urns and signs of sacrifice and was presumably pre-Christian.

As a result of being initially settled by priests they chose an enclosure with a defensible location on the River Bollin where there was relatively high ground close to the river on both sides so that crossing was easy. From there they could travel to all parts of a parish which was extensive, though thinly populated, in part because the countryside was wild and barren and in part because the forest was reserved for hunting.

The parish

At the time of the Norman conquest, the parish consisted of thirty-five townships:

 Adlington
 Alderley
 Birtles
 Bollington
 Bosley
 Butley
 Capesthorne
 Chelford
 Fallibroome
 Gawsworth
 Henbury
 Hurdsfield
 Kettleshulme
 Lower Withington
 Lyme Handley
 Macclesfield
 Macclesfield Forest
 Marton
 Mottram St.Andrew
 Newton
 North Rode
 Old Withington
 Pott Shrigley
 Poynton
 Prestbury
 Rainow
 Siddington
 Sutton
 Taxal
 Tytherington
 Upton
 Wildboarclough
 Wincle
 Woodford
 Worth

Prestbury township was not mentioned in the Domesday Book, perhaps because information was not supplied or because Prestbury was only a church, not a manor.

Twelve of the other townships are mentioned. Butley was valued at 2 shillings at the time of the Domesday Survey, compared with 30 shillings at the time of Edward the Confessor, Adlington and Macclesfield were both worth 20 shillings and Siddington 5 shillings. The other eight townships were valued "Waste".

The church administered the civil as well as ecclesiastical affairs of the parish until the Local Government Act 1894 created rural districts and civil parishes. Three of the townships, Butley, Fallibroome and Prestbury, constitute the present civil parish of Prestbury.

Village

The school, smithies, the mill, inns and the stocks centre on a village street called "The Village", which is broad enough for cattle fairs and the like. Until the 19th century the village street was connected to Pearl Street, the main street of Butley, by a ford.

In about 1825, a bridge of two arches was built, linking the village street to a new road ("New Road") passing behind the cottages and the Admiral Rodney pub on the southeast side of Pearl Street. In 1855 the bridge was replaced by the present bridge with one arch.

During the 19th century Prestbury became an important center of the silk industry. The parish accounted for around a third of the total number of males employed in that branch of textile manufacturing in England and Wales in the early 19th century. Swanwick's factory operated and cottages were built for the workers ("Factory Cottages" or "Irish Row"). Weavers' cottages were built on both New Road and the village, with upper storeys for weaving.

In the 20th century, improved communications made it possible for Prestbury to develop into a residential community.

Prestbury Mill was destroyed by fire in 1940.

Conservation Area

The conservation area includes areas neighbouring the village street, the east side of Macclesfield Road as far south as the Methodist church, and New Road as far north as Butley Cottage and its garden.

Many of the buildings and structures in the Conservation Area are listed by English Heritage, four of them, The Bridge Hotel, Priest's House, Horner's and Prestbury Hall being regarded as "Focal Buildings". Other buildings are considered to be of townscape merit. Trees and even some hedges are important landscape features.

The Manor House was shown as the vicarage on the 1831 map.

Brooks Cottages, marked with a plaque reading "Rodger Brooks and Ellen his wife erected this house in the 24 years of his life Ano Dom 1686" are among the listed buildings on the Butley side of the Bollin.

Other areas
Smithy Cottage, built on the site of a former smithy, is just outside the conservation area.

Butley Hall is shown on the 1831 map but is outside the conservation area, as are the Butley Ash Inn and Spittle House, which was probably built between 1300 and 1450 as a leper hospital.

New estates were built during the 20th century to accommodate commuters.

The defining characteristic of 21st-century development has been the replacement of quite sizeable houses by large mansions, such as that built for footballer Wayne Rooney.

Adlington Hall with strong connections with Prestbury is nearby.

Suburban development
Since the 1970s, there has been quite a lot of new build development in the village. Packsaddle Park is a good example of this. It is a suburban development built on the grounds of Packsaddle House. In addition to this, there has been a lot of redevelopment of existing houses in the village.

Governance
Prestbury is situated in Cheshire East, a unitary authority area with borough status in the ceremonial county of Cheshire. Prestbury falls within the UK parliament constituency of Macclesfield, a strongly Conservative constituency represented by MP David Rutley, who gained office in the 2010 United Kingdom general election. Locally Prestbury is governed by the Prestbury Parish Council which has 10 Councillors and meets once per month.

Churches

St Peter's Church is a Grade I listed building and houses a Saxon cross within a Norman Chapel in its churchyard. The parish's memorial to the dead of the two world wars is in the west porch.

St John's, Adlington, is a daughter church of St Peter's,

A new Methodist Church was built in 2001.

Prestbury falls within the Catholic parish of St Gregory's, Bollington.

Education

Prestbury Church of England Primary School

Sporting facilities

Badminton club
Bowling club
Cricket club
Football clubs
Prestbury Golf Club, a parkland golf course established in 1920, designed by Harry Colt and currently ranked 70th in the country
Macclesfield Rugby Club
Livery yard with indoor arena for hire
Squash rackets club
Tennis club

Transport

The village is a natural traffic hub because of the lay of the land.

The road from Macclesfield to Altrincham (A538) carries traffic between Macclesfield and Wilmslow through the centre of the village. The Macclesfield to Hazel Grove road (A523), built in 1810, goes through the parish in a north–south direction, passing to the east of the village.

Bus routes 19 and 19X operate between Prestbury and Macclesfield

Prestbury railway station is located a few minutes walk from the village centre. It is served by Northern Trains services between Manchester Piccadilly, Macclesfield and Stoke-on-Trent. It was opened on 24 November 1845 and was refurbished in 1986. The south entrance arch to Prestbury Railway Tunnel is grade II listed.

Notable people

Numerous stars of sport and entertainment have lived in Prestbury for various lengths of time, including:

Wes Brown, professional footballer
Michael Carrick, professional football player, plays for Manchester United  
Peter Crouch, professional footballer for Stoke City
Ángel Di María, professional footballer, who signed for Manchester United in 2014 but later moved to Paris Saint-Germain in 2015
Helen Flanagan, actress and model
Andrew Flintoff, professional cricketer and former Vice-Captain of England
Alan Green, football commentator for the BBC
Jaime Harding, musician and singer with Britpop band Marion
Owen Hargreaves, professional footballer who has played for Manchester United and Manchester City
Alex 'Hurricane' Higgins, professional snooker player, lived on the border of Prestbury and Mottram St Andrew during the often tumultuous peak years of his fame
Brian Houghton Hodgson, pioneer naturalist and ethnologist working in India and Nepal where he was a British Resident
Noddy Holder, musician and actor, best known as the vocalist and guitarist with Slade, moved to the area from the West Midlands after rising to fame during the 1970s.
Stephen Ireland, professional footballer
Charles Lawson, Northern Irish actor
Paddy McGuinness, English comedian, actor and television presenter
Peter Mellor (born 1947), English-born American footballer and coach
Sir David Nicholas, former ITN Editor-in-Chief
Stan Pearson, professional footballer who played for Manchester United. He ran a newsagent's shop and post office in Prestbury for 20 years until the 1980s.
Wayne Rooney, professional footballer, moved to Prestbury after signing for Manchester United from Everton in 2004.
Coleen Rooney, English author and television personality
Mohamed Salah, Egyptian professional footballer who plays as a forward for Premier League club Liverpool and the Egypt national team
Robbie Savage, professional footballer who has played for clubs including Manchester United (as a youth and reserve player), Leicester City and Birmingham City, as well as representing Wales
Scott Sinclair, professional footballer
Carlos Tevez, professional footballer, who signed for Manchester United in 2007 and moved to Manchester City in 2009
Geoffrey Wheeler, broadcaster, died in Prestbury
Mike Yarwood, comedian
Ashley Young, professional football player, plays for Aston Villa

1977 bank robbery

In February 1977 the village made national headlines when two employees at the local branch of Williams & Glyn's Bank were murdered during a robbery. Whilst the sub-branch was closed for lunch 22-year-old senior cashier Ian Jebb was repeatedly stabbed and his assistant 19-year-old Susan Hockenhull kidnapped. As the branch was staffed only by these two, the alarm was only raised when customers were unable to enter the bank after the lunchtime closing period . Miss Hockenhull's body was later discovered on moorland, where she had died from hypothermia.

In October 1977 David Walsh, 30, who was employed as a contractor to service adding machines at the bank and who was known to the victims, was found guilty at Chester Crown Court of their murders and was sentenced to life imprisonment. He also received 15 years' imprisonment for the robbery, which had netted £2,445.

See also

Listed buildings in Prestbury, Cheshire

Notes

References
 Cartmell, A. J. S. "The History of Prestbury", St.Peter's Church, Prestbury, 2006
 Hindle, Gordon B. "St. Peter's Prestbury: a personal response", Church of St. Peter, Prestbury, Cheshire, 2001
 
 Prestbury Community Directory, Prestbury Parish Council, 2008
 Prestbury Conservation Area Appraisal: Draft for Public Consultation: Macclesfield Borough Council, January 2006, accessed 28 October 2007
  Prestbury Village Design Statement: Supplementary Planning Document, Borough of Macclesfield, June 2007, accessed 28 October 2007
 Renaud, Frank "Contributions towards a history of the ancient Parish of Prestbury in Cheshire", the Chetham Society, 1876
 Village Design Statement for Prestbury Parish, accessed 15 April 2008

External links

 Prestbury Parish Council Official website
 Plan for Prestbury
 All about Prestbury, past, present and future
 Oliver Wood Photography A collection of photos of Prestbury and the surrounding area.
 Travel article "The Wilmslow Boys" by A.A.Gill. Prestbury slated as "Smug Central"

Villages in Cheshire
Civil parishes in Cheshire